Borrah Minevitch (sometimes spelled Minnevitch; 5 November 1902, Borovin, Minsk, Russian Empire – 26 June 1955, Paris, France), born Boruch Minewitz, was a notable harmonica player, actor, and leader of his group The Harmonica Rascals. The Harmonica Rascals, an ensemble of approximately ten pieces, recorded for Brunswick Records in 1933, and later for Decca Records where Minevitch hired Richard Hayman as an arranger for the Rascals. (Hayman later worked as an arranger for MGM and the Boston Pops Orchestra.)

In 1923, Minevitch sold the rights to his work on the chromatic harmonica to Hohner for one million dollars and the company subsequently made a successful "Borrah Minevitch" line of harmonicas. He spent the rest of his career as a music hall performer, comedy film actor, impresario, film financier, and film distributor.

Minevitch performed in numerous feature length Hollywood movies between 1934 and 1943 including Love Under Fire (20th Century Fox 1937), Always in My Heart (Warner Bros., 1942), Top Man (Universal Pictures 1943), Hit Parade of 1941 (Republic Pictures, 1941), Tramp, Tramp, Tramp (Columbia Pictures, 1941) and One in a Million (20th Century Fox, 1936).

He appeared in a short film made by Lee DeForest in the short-lived sound-on-film process Phonofilm, titled A Boston Star: Borrah Minevitch, which premiered at the Rivoli Theater in New York City on 15 April 1923. He and the Rascals appeared in Lazy Bones (1934), which was a part live action, part animated film released by Fleischer Studios as one of their Screen Songs series, the live-action short Borrah Minevitch and His Harmonica Rascals (Vitaphone, 1935) and Borrah Minevitch and his Harmonica School (Warner Bros., 1942) directed by Jean Negulesco.

In 1947, Minevitch retired from performing and moved to France.  While living in Europe he worked as a film producer and distributor and opened a jazz nightclub on the Ile St Louis in Paris which he named "Au Franc Pinot". He helped arrange the United States distribution for his friend Jacques Tati's films Jour de fête (1949) and Monsieur Hulot's Holiday (1953) before his death in Paris in 1955 at age 52.

References

Links

"Harmonicist in London". Time. February 24, 1936.
Jacques Tati: His Life and Art by David Bellos, (Random House, 2011), pp. 158–61

External links

1902 births
1955 deaths
Harmonica players
Musicians from Minsk
Russian Jews
Emigrants from the Russian Empire to the United States
American emigrants to France